Moati is a surname. Notable people with the surname include: 

Félix Moati (born 1990), French actor, film director and screenwriter, son of Serge
Nine Moati (1937-2021), French novelist, sister of Serge
Serge Moati (born 1946), French journalist, television presenter, film director and writer